This is a list of all historic ships of the Bangladesh Navy that are decommissioned or damaged from 1971.

Bangladesh vessels use the prefix "BNS", standing for "Bangladesh Navy Ship".

Frigates

Offshore patrol vessels

Fast attack craft

Riverine Patrol Boats

Research and survey ships

Training ship

Amphibious warfare

Auxiliaries

See also
 List of active ships of the Bangladesh Navy
 List of ships of the Bangladesh Coast Guard
 List of active aircraft of the Bangladesh Air Force
 List of historic aircraft of the Bangladesh Air Force
 List of active Bangladesh military aircraft

References